Duo Melis is a classical guitar duo consisting of Alexis Muzurakis and Susana Prieto.

Reviews

References

External links
 

Classical guitar ensembles